This is a list of airlines operating with an air operator's certificate granted by the Federal Office of Civil Aviation of Switzerland.

Scheduled airlines

Charter airlines

See also 
List of defunct airlines of Switzerland
Lists of airlines

References
 

 
Airlines
Switzerland
Airlines
Switzerland